Bursey Icefalls is the icefalls draining the north slope of Mount Bursey in the Flood Range, Marie Byrd Land. It was mapped by the United States Geological Survey from surveys and from U.S. Navy air photos, 1959–65, and named by the Advisory Committee on Antarctic Names in association with Mount Bursey.

See also
Heaps Rock

References
 

Icefalls of Antarctica
Bodies of ice of Marie Byrd Land
Flood Range